Kauko Esko Järvinen (15 December 1907 – 7 March 1976) was a Finnish competitor in the Nordic combined and military patrol (precursor to biathlon). He won an individual bronze medal in the Nordic combined at the 1929 World Championships. At the 1928 Winter Olympics he finished fifth in the Nordic combined and 22nd in the ski jumping event. He also placed second in the team military patrol, which was a demonstration sport at those Olympics, and served as the flag bearer for Finland at the opening ceremony.

After retiring from competitions Järvinen opened a ski manufacturing factory in Lahti, which ran until 1974 and went bankrupt in 1991, yet his son continued small-scale production of wooden skis. His brother Erkki was an Olympic triple jumper.

References

External links

1907 births
1976 deaths
Sportspeople from Lahti
People from Häme Province (Grand Duchy of Finland)
Finnish male Nordic combined skiers
Finnish male ski jumpers
Finnish military patrol (sport) runners
Olympic Nordic combined skiers of Finland
Olympic ski jumpers of Finland
Olympic biathletes of Finland
Nordic combined skiers at the 1928 Winter Olympics
Ski jumpers at the 1928 Winter Olympics
Military patrol competitors at the 1928 Winter Olympics
FIS Nordic World Ski Championships medalists in Nordic combined